Erin Daniels ( Cohen) is an American actress. She is best known for her role as Dana Fairbanks on The L Word (2004–2007). Her feature film work includes A Single Man (2009) and One Hour Photo (2002).

Early life 
Daniels was born Erin Cohen in St. Louis, Missouri, where she grew up. Her father is an architect, and her mother is a clinical social worker. She grew up in a Jewish family; her mother co-founded the Central Reform Congregation in St. Louis and her grandmother received an award from the National Conference of Christians and Jews. She attended Clayton High School and Vassar College, graduating from the latter in 1995 after majoring in art.

Career 
After Vassar, she moved to New York City, where she studied with William Esper, a protégé of Sanford Meisner, and worked Off Broadway. She then moved to Los Angeles for a part on the short-lived TV series Action.

In 2002, the St. Louis Film Festival awarded Daniels the Emerging Star Award.refcn She appeared in One Hour Photo, Wheelmen, and House of 1000 Corpses before becoming a major cast member of Showtime's The L Word. Her depiction of Dana Fairbanks on that show prompted an anonymous donation of a million dollars to the Dr. Susan Love Research Foundation, an organization that promotes and funds breast cancer intraductal research.

Daniels has also appeared in the TV shows Action, Jericho, Dexter, Saving Grace, Big Shots, Justice, CSI and Swingtown.

She played the role of The Mother in Joshua Tree, 1951: A Portrait of James Dean.

Personal life 

Daniels married producer Chris Uettwiller in 2008, and had two children with him. The couple  divorced in February 2019.

Filmography

Television credits

References

External links 
 
 Erin Daniels interview at Diva Magazine official site

American film actresses
American television actresses
Jewish American actresses
Living people
Actresses from St. Louis
Vassar College alumni
20th-century American actresses
21st-century American actresses
21st-century American Jews
Year of birth missing (living people)